Greece competed at the 1968 Summer Olympics in Mexico City, Mexico. 44 competitors, all men, took part in 27 events in 7 sports. Greek athletes have competed in every Summer Olympic Games.

Medalists

Athletics

Christos Papanikolaou, pole vault (5,35 m): 4th place

Boxing

Sailing

Shooting

Seven shooters, all men, represented Greece in 1968.

25 m pistol
 Alkiviadis Papageorgopoulos

50 m rifle, prone
 Lambis Manthos
 Ioannis Skarafingas

Trap
 Georgios Pangalos
 Markos Tzoumaras

Skeet
 Panagiotis Xanthakos
 Menelaos Mikhailidis

Water polo

Men's Team Competition
Preliminary Round (Group B)
 Lost to Netherlands (5:9)
 Lost to Japan (7:8)
 Defeated United Arab Republic (7:6)
 Lost to East Germany (4:11)
 Lost to Mexico (8:11)
 Lost to Yugoslavia (1:11)
 Lost to Italy (2:6)
Classification Matches
13th/14th place: Lost to Brazil (2:5) → Fourteenth place

Team Roster
Andreas Garifallos
Dimitrios Kougevetopoulos
Georgios Palikaris
Georgios Theodorakopoulos
Ioannis Palios
Ioannis Thimaras
Kyriakos Iosifidis
Nikolaos Tsangas
Panagiotis Mathioudakis
Panagiotis Mikhalos
Thomas Karalogos

Weightlifting

Wrestling

References

External links
Official Olympic Reports
International Olympic Committee results database

Nations at the 1968 Summer Olympics
1968
O